Capture of Cairo may refer to:

Capture of Cairo (1517) by the Ottomans
Siege of Cairo (1801) by the British and Ottomans
Capture by the British in the Anglo–Egyptian War (1882)